Gabriele Amorth  (1 May 1925 – 16 September 2016) was an Italian Catholic priest and exorcist of the Diocese of Rome who claimed to have performed tens of thousands of exorcisms throughout his life. Amorth, along with five other priests, founded the International Association of Exorcists.

Life and work
Amorth was born in Modena, Emilia-Romagna, Italy on 1 May 1925. He was ordained a Roman Catholic priest in 1954 and was appointed an exorcist of the Diocese of Rome in June 1986, under the tutelage of Candido Amantini. He was a member of the Society of St. Paul, the congregation founded by Giacomo Alberione in 1914. In 1990, he founded the International Association of Exorcists and was president until his retirement in 2000.

Amorth died at the age of 91 on 16 September 2016, a short time after he was hospitalised for pulmonary complications.

Exorcisms
In October 2000, it was reported he had performed over 50,000 exorcisms (which ranged from "a few minutes" to "several hours" in length). In March 2010, he said that the number had increased to 70,000. By May 2013, he said he had performed 160,000 exorcisms in the course of his ministry. According to Amorth, each exorcism does not represent a victim of possession, but rather each exorcism is counted as a prayer or ritual alone, and some possession victims required hundreds of exorcisms.

Edward Peters, a professor of canon law, finds Amorth's claim to have personally performed 30,000 exorcisms over 9 years "astounding". Even accepting Amorth's claim that only 94 of his 30,000 exorcisms represented full-blown possession, that would have required roughly one case a month to be thoroughly examined and processed over nine years with hardly a break. Amorth believed that a person may be possessed by more than one demon at once, sometimes numbering in the thousands, which is what accounts for the high number of reputed demons exorcised.

When asked whether the devil can strike inside the Vatican City, Amorth stated, "He has tried already. He did it in 1981 by attacking John Paul II by working with those who armed Ali Ağca."

He attributed the number of exorcisms performed to his opinion that "People have lost the Faith, and superstition, magic, Satanism, or ouija boards have taken its place, which then open all the doors to the presence of demons."

Amorth offered the following guidelines to those exercising the charism of exorcism. Any such person must be highly regarded for his prayer life, faith, acts of charity and judgement. In addition he must rely solely on the "Word of God" and traditional prayer, be completely detached from monetary concerns, profoundly humble and treasure obscurity.

Books
Amorth wrote two memoirs of his time as an exorcist - An Exorcist Tells His Story and An Exorcist: More Stories. The books include references to official Roman Catholic teachings on demonology while the main emphasis is on Amorth's experience as an exorcist.  Both include references to the diagnosis and treatment of spiritual problems. The books briefly cover the topics of demonic contraction and curses. He states, "A curse can originate from such things as maledictions by close relatives, a habit of blaspheming, membership in Freemasonry, spiritic or magic practices, and so on."

Father Amorth wrote more than thirty books in Italian, many of which have been translated into other languages. The following are his books in English:
 An Exorcist Tells His Story - published on March 1, 1999 by Ignatius Press
 An Exorcist: More Stories - published on February 1, 2002 by Ignatius Press
 An Exorcist Explains the Demonic: The Antics of Satan and His Army of Fallen Angels - published on October 20, 2016 by Sophia Press
 Father Amorth: My Battle Against Satan - published on November 15, 2018 by Sophia Press
 The Devil is Afraid of Me: The Life and Work of the World's Most Popular Exorcist - published on January 19, 2020 by Sophia Press

Amorth was also interviewed for the second episode of True Horror with Anthony Head, presented by Anthony Head. He explained he would never perform an exorcism based solely on someone's claims of possession; always directs people to psychiatrists and doctors first, and that when he sees someone is not possessed but the person still insists, he replies: "You have no devil. If you have a problem, talk to a good vet."

Film 
The Pope's Exorcist is a film about Amorth's work. It will be launched in April 2023. It features Russell Crowe.

Views

Views on yoga

At a film festival in Umbria (where he was invited to introduce the 2011 film about Exorcism called The Rite), he is quoted as saying that yoga is satanic because it leads to practice of Hinduism and "all eastern religions are based on a false belief in reincarnation" and "practicing yoga is satanic, it leads to evil just like reading Harry Potter."

Disappearance of Emanuela Orlandi
Amorth claimed that Emanuela Orlandi, a Vatican City schoolgirl who went missing in Rome in 1983, was kidnapped for a sex party by a gang involving Vatican police and foreign diplomats. He said that she was later murdered and her body disposed of. Amorth claimed that girls were recruited at the Vatican for parties, adding that her death "was a crime with a sexual motive."

Distinctions
 Medal of Liberation (8 September 2016) by the Prefect of Rome in the presence of Italy's minister of defense, for the important role he played in the partisan struggle against the Nazis in 1943.

Bibliography
 An Exorcist Tells his Story (translated by Nicoletta V. Mackenzie), 1999.
 Gospel of Mary: A Month With the Mother of God, 2000.
 An Exorcist: More Stories (translated by Nicoletta V. Mackenzie), 2002.
 Esorcisti e Psichiatri, 2002.
 Pater Pio: Lebensgeschichte eines Heiligen, 2003.
 Dietro un sorriso: Beata Alexandrina Maria da Costa, Elledici, 2006.
 Memorie di un esorcista, 2010.
 An Exorcist Explains the Demonic (with Stefano Stimamiglio, translated by Charlotte J. Fasi), 2016.

Filmography
 The Devil and Father Amorth

References

Sources

Further reading

External links 

1925 births
2016 deaths
Religious leaders from Modena
Catholic exorcists
Italian anti-communists
Italian memoirists
Anti-Masonry
20th-century Italian Roman Catholic priests
21st-century Italian Roman Catholic priests
Italian exorcists